The 2019 South Australian National Football League season (officially the SANFL Statewide Super League) was the 140th season of the South Australian National Football League (SANFL) Australian rules football competition.
The season commenced on Friday, 29 March and concluded with the SANFL Grand Final on Sunday, 22 September.  won their fifth premiership after defeating  by 28 points in the Grand Final, their first flag since 1986.

Premiership Season

Round 1

Round 2

Round 3

Round 4

Round 5

Round 6

State Game

Round 7

Round 8

Round 9

Round 10

Round 11

Round 12

Round 13

Round 14

Round 15

Round 16

Round 17

Round 18

Ladder 

 began the season on –4 premiership points as a result of the 19 man controversy in the 2018 Preliminary Final.

Finals series

Qualifying and Elimination Finals

Semi-finals

Preliminary final

Grand Final

References 

South Australian National Football League seasons
SANFL